CM Yoko is the third studio album by Yoko Kanno. It was originally released exclusively though the iTunes Store on September 30, 2007. All the music was written by Yoko Kanno and the majority was for Japanese television advertisements. It reached the 44th place on the Oricon Weekly Albums Chart.

Track listing

References

2007 albums
Yoko Kanno albums
ITunes-exclusive releases
Japanese television commercials